Robert Lucas Chance (8 October 1782 – 7 March 1865), known as Lucas Chance, was an English glass merchant and manufacturer in Birmingham. He founded the company which became Chance Brothers.

Family background
Lucas Chance was the fifth child and eldest son of William Chance (a partner in Nailsea Glassworks) and Sarah Lucas (daughter of John Robert Lucas).

Working life
Chance started work at his father's business in Birmingham, at the age of 12, then started his own glass merchant business in London in 1815. This involved many trips to France where he formed alliances with French owners. In 1824 he purchased the British Crown Glass Company, following the death of the owner, Thomas Shutt, for £24,000.

He founded Chance Glass works, then formed a partnership with John Hartley in 1828. After experiencing financial difficulties in 1832, Lucas was then saved by his brother, William, who also became a partner. The partnership with Hartley's sons (who inherited the partnership on their father's death in 1833) was dissolved in 1836 and the business was then named Chance Brothers & Company.

In 1830, he became great friends with Georges Bontemps, a leading director of a glassworks in France, who would later assist at Chance Brothers following his exile from France. Chance was instrumental in introducing the method of sheet glass production for making flat glass for (primarily) windows. This would eventually dispose the previous working method of crown glass. He was also one of the great exponents in removing the crippling excise duty and the Window Tax. Following these actions, the glass trade in England started to flourish.

In 1851, Chance Brothers supplied the glass to glaze the Crystal Palace, which was probably partly due to Chance's previous links with Joseph Paxton, the architect, when supplying glass for the greenhouses at Chatsworth House.

The two brothers were noted as being very philanthropic, founding a school (1845), a library and a church, all primarily for the workforce. Lucas Chance died in 1865, and was buried in Key Hill Cemetery, Birmingham.

References

Chance, J. F. (1919) A History of the Firm of Chance Brothers & Co., Glass and Alkali Manufacturers. London: Printed for private circulation by Spottiswoode, Ballantyne & Co

1782 births
1865 deaths
Glass makers
Burials at Key Hill Cemetery
19th-century British businesspeople